Korvat auki r.y. (Finnish: "Ears Open Society") is a Finnish society, founded in 1977 to advocate and import contemporary music. The founders include  Kaija Saariaho, Jouni Kaipainen, Magnus Lindberg, Olli Kortekangas, Eero Hämeenniemi, and Esa-Pekka Salonen. The society organizes concerts and seminars. Initiated by the society, two ensembles have been created to perform new music in Finland: Toimii and Zagros.

References

External links
 Korvat auki website.
 Korvat auki at Uppslagsverket Finland (in Swedish).

Music organisations based in Finland
Modernism (music)
1977 in music
Organizations established in 1977